Lohitpur is a village in Lohit district, Arunachal Pradesh, India. As per 2011 Census of India, Lohitpur has a population of 1,514 people including 1,029 males and 485 females, with a literacy rate of 89.54%.

Lohitpur village is a high-altitude area. Some scenes of Hindi movie Koyla were shot in Lohitpur.

References 

Villages in Lohit district